Muhsin Al-Ramli (officially known as Muhisin Mutlak Rodhan; born 7 March 1967) is an expatriate Iraqi writer living in Madrid, Spain since 1995. He is a translator of several Spanish classics to Arabic. He produced the complete translation of Don Quixote from Spanish to Arabic. He teaches at the Saint Louis University Madrid Campus. He is the current editor of Alwah, a magazine of Arabic literature and thought, which he co-founded.

Early life and education
In 2003, he earned a Doctorate in Philosophy and Letters and Spanish Philology from the Autonomous University of Madrid. His thesis topic was The Imprint of Islamic Culture in Don Quixote.   He is the brother of the writer and poet Hassan Mutlak.

Published works

 Gift from the Century to Come (Short stories) 1995
 In Search of a Live Heart (Theater) 1997
 Papers far from the Tigris (Short stories) 1998
 Scattered Crumbs (Novel) 2000
 The Happy Nights of the Bombing (Narrative) 2003
 We Are All Widowers of the Answers (Poetry) 2005
 Dates on My Fingers (Novel) 2008
 Asleep among the Soldiers (Poetry) 2011
 The Oranges Of Baghdad and Chinese Love (Short stories) 2011
 The President's Gardens (Novel) 2012
 The wolf of love and books (Novel) 2015
 Children and Shoes (Novel) 2018
 Daughter of the Tigris (Novel) 2019

Translations 
1. Laranjas e giletes em Bagdá/Naranjas y cuchillas en Bagdad, Fedra Rodríguez Hinojosa (Trans.),  (n.t.) Revista Literária em Tradução, nº 1 (set/2010), Fpolis/Brasil, ISSN 2177-5141

References

External links
 The documentary about Al-Ramli in the Arabic channel: ALJAZEERA
 Documentary in the Spanish Channel TVE, about: The Iraqi writer Muhsin Al-Ramli.
 Al-Ramli: "I Am Iraq" / By Constanza Vieira / IPS
 Official blog
 Poem by Muhsin Al-Ramli / review (BLACK RENAISSANCE NOIRE), Vol7 Nº2, 2007 New York
 Review / Scattered Crumbs / Family Matters / by Harold Braswell
 from Scattered Crumbs by Muhsin Al-Ramli
 About: Asleep among the Soldiers by Muhsin Al-Ramli / in Aljazeera.net (in Arabic).
 Interview with the author
 IPAF
 Longlist Announced for 2013 International Prize for Arabic Fiction
 Looking at the 2013 Longlist: Muhsin al-Ramli’s ‘The President’s Gardens’
 About The President’s Gardens in Aljazeera.net

Living people
1967 births
Iraqi writers
Arabic-language novelists
Spanish people of Iraqi descent
20th-century Iraqi poets
Iraqi translators
Iraqi male short story writers
Iraqi journalists
Spanish–Arabic translators
Arabic–Spanish translators
21st-century Iraqi poets